The Chin Shan Yen Gate is a gate in Shilin District, Taipei, Taiwan.

History
The gate was built in 1825 by Zhangzhou immigrants from Fujian as a defense during conflict with Quanzhou immigrants.

Architecture
The gate is made of quarry stone. The top of the gate was crenelated with loopholes for firing weapons. There are four Chinese characters carved on the rock outside the gate by Qing Dynasty scholar Pan Yongqing depicting the beauty of Chin Shan Yen Hui Chi Temple.

Transportation
The temple is accessible within walking distance east of Zhishan Station of Taipei Metro.

See also
 List of tourist attractions in Taiwan

References

1825 establishments in Taiwan
Gates in Taipei